David Charles McKenzie (born 30 May 1933) is a former Australian politician. Born in Melbourne, he was a teacher before entering politics. He was involved in local politics as a member of Diamond Valley Shire Council, of which he was president 1969–71. In 1972, he was elected to the Australian House of Representatives as the member for Diamond Valley, defeating Liberal MP Neil Brown. As a backbench Member in 1973 McKenzie, together with fellow Labor Member Tony Lamb, introduced the Medical Practice Clarification Bill which, if passed, would have allowed abortion in the Australian Capital Territory. The Bill was defeated after a conscience vote on 10 May 1973 by 98 votes to 23. McKenzie held the seat until his defeat by Brown in 1975.

References

Australian Labor Party members of the Parliament of Australia
Members of the Australian House of Representatives for Diamond Valley
Members of the Australian House of Representatives
1933 births
Living people
20th-century Australian politicians